Vada Sheid (August 19, 1916 – February 11, 2008) was a politician from Mountain Home, Arkansas who served in the Arkansas General Assembly for 20 years; in the Arkansas House of Representatives from 1967 to 1977, the Arkansas Senate from 1977 to 1985, and returning to the House during the 79th Arkansas General Assembly. She is the first woman to serve in both houses of the General Assembly, and the first non-widow's succession woman to serve in the Arkansas Senate. Known by constituents as "Miss Vada", she worked on behalf of Ozark Mountain residents with a focus on education and infrastructure projects.

Early life
Sheid was born on August 19, 1916 in Wideman, Arkansas; the only child of J. W. "Bill" Webb and Gertrude Webb. She was named Vada by her maternal grandmother. Bill Webb was very involved in local politics, and took Vada to campaign events and gatherings as a child in Izard and Fulton counties. The family moved to Calico Rock in 1926 and attended school in the Calico Rock School District, including participating in school plays and debates. She graduated from Calico Rock High School in 1934 during the Great Depression among 12 other students. Her first formal political role was volunteering for John C. Ashley's bid for the 1936 Arkansas gubernatorial election. Ashley withdrew before the Democratic primary, but encouraged Sheid to run for office in the future. Following a housefire at the Webb home that burned the family's savings, Vada attended Draughon’s Practical Business College in Little Rock, Arkansas rather than a four-year college she had planned to attend, followed by a job as Izard County Welfare Director.

She married Carl R. Sheid on December 31, 1940, the son and grandson of the area's country doctors. They moved to Little Rock where Sheid took a job with the state welfare department. The newlyweds briefly lived in El Dorado, Arkansas after Carl was promoted to be store manager of the El Dorado Kroger, before moving to Mountain Home. After Carl was drafted during World War II, Vada worked as a clerk for the government on the construction of Norfork Dam, and moved to Little Rock to work for Nancy Hall in the Arkansas Secretary of State Crip Hall's office. After briefly operating a grocery store, the couple bought a furniture store and ran it together. They had a son, Richard, in 1948.

Political career
Encouraged by her father, Sheid challenged incumbent Baxter County Treasurer Bob Tipton in 1956. Losing by 200 votes, she challenged Tipton again two years later and won the office. Sheid held the position for three two-year terms until she was defeated by Don Cockrum. In 1966, Sheid dying father convinced her to run for the Arkansas House of Representatives District 5 seat covering Baxter and Fulton counties. He died three days after she filed as a candidate; Sheid defeated Russell J. Benton in the Democratic primary and Republican incumbent Orville D. Pendergrass in the general election.

Return to the House
Sheid returned to the Arkansas House of Representatives in 1993 to serve in the 79th Arkansas General Assembly.

Representative Ed Gilbert (D-Mountain Home) had sought re-election in District 40, but later revealed he lived outside the district and thus was ineligible. The local Democratic Party voted Sheid as Gilbert's replacement on September 11 for the November 3, 1992 election against Doris DeSousa. The Baxter County Republican Committee challenged the Democrats' ability to replace Gilbert in court.

Legacy
She wrote an autobiography, Vada: Nothing Personal, Just Politics. It was published posthumously. Arkansas State University - Mountain Home professor Clement Mulloy wrote a book about her and has given presentations on her life. The Vada Sheid Community Development Center is named for her.

References

 
 
 

1916 births
2008 deaths
20th-century American politicians
Writers from Arkansas
21st-century American women writers
20th-century American women writers
Women state legislators in Arkansas
American political writers
Democratic Party Arkansas state senators
Democratic Party members of the Arkansas House of Representatives
21st-century American memoirists
People from Mountain Home, Arkansas
People from Izard County, Arkansas
American women memoirists
20th-century American women politicians